The 2009–10 Italian Rugby Union Championship was the 80th season of the Italian Rugby Union Championship. It was also the last season to feature Benetton Treviso before they joined the Celtic League facing teams from Scotland, Ireland and Wales.

Results

Matchday 1

Matchday 2

Matchday 3

Matchday 4

Matchday 5

Matchday 6

Matchday 7

Matchday 8

Matchday 9

Matchday 10

Matchday 11

Matchday 12

Matchday 13

Matchday 14

Matchday 15

Matchday 16

Matchday 17

Matchday 18

Table

2008-09
2009–10 in Italian rugby union
Italy